The Joseph Baptista Gardens, locally known as the Mazagaon Gardens, is a  park in Mazagaon, South Mumbai, India.

Shortly after India's independence in 1947, the gardens were renamed after Joseph Baptista, an Indian freedom activist from Mazagaon.

History
After the British arrived in Bombay in the 1660s, they selected Bhandarwala Hill, a basalt rocky outcrop as a site for the Mazagon Fort, that was built in 1680. However, the fort was completely razed by Siddi ruler Yakut Khan after he withdrew his siege on the orders of the Mughal emperor, Aurangzeb.

In 1884, to address the shortage of potable water in the city, several hills were selected as storage tanks by the civic administration. Water from the Vihar Lake was pumped to the Bhandarwada Hill reservoir, that was then distributed to the city. Over it the John Hay Grant park was built.

Park
The park is frequented by neighbourhood residents. It is mostly patronised by couples, joggers, senior citizens, and students who find peaceful corners to study. Cycas, ixora, musanda, bougainvillea, and hibiscus are some of the plants found in the garden. As part of a makeover plan, the Municipal Corporation of Greater Mumbai (BMC) earmarked  to beautify the gardens. Local residents however are upset over the plans for the makeover, and have claimed that the BMC have uprooted trees, thrown away wrought iron gates. Work on the renovations is set to be completed by February 2009.

See also
Malabar Hill
Kamla Nehru Park
Mazagaon Fort

References

Gallery

Parks in Mumbai